Associação Desportiva Ninense Futebol Clube (abbreviated as AD Ninense) is a Portuguese football club based in Nine in the district of Vila Nova de Famalicão.

Background
Vilaverdense FC currently plays in the Campeonato Nacional de Seniores Série A which is the third tier of Portuguese football. The club was founded in 1970 and they play their home matches at the Complexo Desportivo de Nine in Nine. The stadium has a capacity to accommodate 1,500 spectators.

The club is affiliated to Associação de Futebol de Braga and has competed in the AF Braga Taça. The club entered the national cup competition known as Taça de Portugal for the first time in the 2013–14.

Season to season

Current squad

Goalkeepers :
  João Rodrigues
  André Ferreira

Defense :
  André Correia
  Nuno Araújo
  China
  David
  Rui Torres
  Tiago Fernandes
  João Duarte
  Fábio Carvalho

Middle :
  César Marques
  Arturinho
  Cesário
  Hélder Guimarães
  Salgueiro

Forward :
  Luís Tiago
  Bruno Silva
  João Cruz
  Ruizinho
  Canetas
  Pedrinho

Honours
 AF Braga Divisão de Honra: 2012–13
 AF Braga 1st Division: 2011–12

Footnotes

Football clubs in Portugal
Association football clubs established in 1970
1970 establishments in Portugal